Program 81, later Program 82 was a new wave band from Bergen, Norway.
After a self-titled mini LP and the LP Try to reach ... both of which came in 1981, the singer «Pjusken» replaced by Kate Augestad. At the end they changed their name to Program 82. At the same time they started to perform their music with English lyrics and released the album Pictures. At the next turn of the year, however, they chose to keep the name, and they returned to sing Norwegian texts. Slippe fri (1983) was the last album by Program 82.

Although the band released four albums on the Åge Aleksandersen label "Norsk Plateselskap", they never became any rock stars other than in Bergen. Hovland, Kalvenes and Augestad has contributed in a number of different bands and projects in Bergen. Hovlan also regular with guitarist  Mads Eriksen, and touring with  Terje Rypdal and  Chris Thompson.

Band members 
 Christian Lund - drums
 Frank Hovland - bass guitar
 Maia Urstad - guitar
 Kåre Kalvenes - guitar
 Arne Moe Vindedal - percussion
 Marianne «Pjusken» Sletten  - vocals
 Kate Augestad - vocals
 Nicolay Leganger - lyricist

Discography 
 1981: Program 81 (mini-LP)
 1981: Try to reach ... (Norwegian Label A / S)
 1982: Pictures (Norwegian Label A / S)
 1983: Unleash (Pro-Gram O'Phone3)

References

Norwegian rock music groups
Musical groups established in 1981
1981 establishments in Norway
Musical groups from Bergen